Marinus Cornelis "Rinus" Paul (born 17 August 1941) is a retired Dutch road and track cyclist. On track, he placed fourth in the 2 km tandem event at the 1960 Summer Olympics. On the road, he won the Ronde van Zuid-Holland in 1960 and Ronde van Noord-Holland in 1963, as well as one stage of the Olympia's Tour in 1963.

See also
 List of Dutch Olympic cyclists

References

1941 births
Living people
Olympic cyclists of the Netherlands
Cyclists at the 1960 Summer Olympics
Dutch male cyclists
Cyclists from The Hague